Clubbed to Death may refer to any of the following things:

 "Clubbed to Death" (instrumental), a track on Rob Dougan's album Furious Angels, featured in the soundtrack of The Matrix
 Clubbed to Death (film), a 1997 French film starring Élodie Bouchez
 Clubbed to Death, an album by The Stranglers
 Clubbed to Death, an Edinburgh-based electronic band